The Heinkel HD 41 was a reconnaissance developed in Germany in the 1920s.

Design and development

Variants
Data from:1000aircraftphotos : Heinkel H.D.41a
HD 41a The initial designation of the first prototype, powered by a  Siemens Jupiter VI; one built.
HD 41bPowered by a  BMW VI; one built.
HD 41cPowered by a  BMW VI 7.3Zu; two built. The first aircraft, (c/n 363, D-1011), was converted to be the first pre-production Heinkel He 45A and the second HD 41c, (c/n 364, D-2064), was converted to be the prototype Heinkel He 45 with a new registration (D-ILEU)

Specifications (HD.41a)

References

1920s German military reconnaissance aircraft
HD 41
Biplanes
Aircraft first flown in 1929